Neptis quintilla, the angled petty sailer, is a butterfly in the family Nymphalidae. It is found in Guinea-Bissau, Guinea, Sierra Leone, Ivory Coast, Ghana, Nigeria, Cameroon, Angola, the Democratic Republic of the Congo, Uganda and western Kenya. The habitat consists of open areas in wet forests with a canopy cover.

The larvae feed on Acacia species.

References

Butterflies described in 1890
quintilla
Butterflies of Africa